The Afrikaans Language Monument is located on a hill overlooking Paarl, Western Cape Province, South Africa. Officially opened on 10 October 1975, it commemorates the semicentenary of Afrikaans being declared an official language of South Africa separate from Dutch. Also, it was erected on the 100th anniversary of the founding of Genootskap van Regte Afrikaners (the Society of Real Afrikaners) in Paarl, the organisation that helped strengthen Afrikaners' identity and pride in their language.
The monument was used as a filming location for the Twelfth series of Doctor Who.

Structure
The monument consists of various tapering structures of a convex and concave nature, symbolising the influences of different languages and cultures on Afrikaans itself, as well as political developments in South Africa, as follows:

Clear West – the European heritage of the language
Magical Africa – the African influences on the language
Bridge – between Europe and Africa
Afrikaans – the language itself
Republic – declared in 1961
Malay language and culture
(There is also an open stadium at the bottom of the structure where concerts and events are held)

Plaque inscriptions 
On a large plaque at the entrance are two quotations from prominent poets writing in Afrikaans:

  – N.P. van Wyk Louw
"Afrikaans is the language that connects Western Europe and Africa...  It forms a bridge between the large, shining West and the magical Africa...  And what great things may come from their union – that is maybe what lies ahead for Afrikaans to discover.  But what we must never forget, is that this change of country and landscape sharpened, kneaded and knitted this newly-becoming language...  And so Afrikaans became able to speak out from this new land...  Our task lies in the use that we make and will make of this gleaming vehicle..."
  – C.J. Langenhoven
"If we plant a row of poles down this hall now, ten poles, to represent the last ten years, and on each pole we make a mark at a height from the floor corresponding to the relative written use of Afrikaans in the respective year, and we draw a line, from the first here near the floor to the last over there against the loft, then the line would describe a rapidly rising arc, not only quickly rising, but rising in a quickly increasing manner.  Let us now, in our imagination, extend the arc for the ten coming years from now.  See you, sirs, where the point shall be, outside in the blue sky high over Bloemfontein, in the year 1924."

The phrase "DIT IS ONS ERNS" (roughly "we are earnest [about this]", or "this is our earnestness") is emblazoned on the pathway leading up to the monument.

Burgersdorp monument

The first monument to commemorate Afrikaans was the monument in Burgersdorp, which was built in 1893, although it refers to the Hollandse taal or the Dutch language. It depicts a woman pointing her finger at a book in her hands.

References

External links

 Homepage
 Flight over the Afrikaans Language Monument
 Article about Johann Rupert's decision to withdraw advertising from Wallpaper magazine
 History and description of the Paarl monument
 Afrikaans Museum & Monument
 Photos of the two monuments (original and replica) at Burgersdorp
 Directory to Paarl

1975 establishments in South Africa
Buildings and structures completed in 1975
Afrikaans
Monuments and memorials in South Africa
Paarl
Buildings and structures in the Western Cape
Obelisks in South Africa
20th-century architecture in South Africa